Rajesh Bishnoi (born 8 October 1987) is an Indian cricketer who plays for Rajasthan. He made his first-class debut for Rajasthan in the 2006–07 Ranji Trophy on 23 November 2006. He was the leading run-scorer for Rajasthan in the 2017–18 Ranji Trophy, with 436 runs in six matches.

References

External links
 

1987 births
Living people
Indian cricketers
Rajasthan cricketers
People from Bikaner
Royal Challengers Bangalore cricketers